Tooth of Crime is an album by T Bone Burnett. The album is a selection of music written by Burnett for the 1996 production of Sam Shepard's play The Tooth of Crime.

Reception

Music critic Mark Deming of Allmusic praised the album and wrote "Tooth of Crime is a smart, absorbing, and beautifully disquieting collection of songs that could have come from no one else but T Bone Burnett, and it shows that one of America's best songwriters may be working at a very deliberate pace but he still has some remarkable things left to tell us."

Track listing
 "Anything I Say Can and Will Be Used Against You" – 4:02
 "Dope Island" – 4:16
 "The Slowdown" – 4:43
 "Blind Man" – 1:22
 "Kill Zone" – 4:19
 "The Rat Age" – 5:30
 "Swizzle Stick" – 5:10
 "Telepresence (Make the Metal Scream)" – 3:06
 "Here Come the Philistines" – 3:33
 "Sweet Lullaby" – 3:24

Personnel

 T-Bone Burnett – vocals, guitar, six-string bass, piano
 Sam Phillips – vocals, backing vocals
 Marc Ribot – banjo, guitar
 Greg Leisz – steel guitar
 Jon Brion – Chamberlin, baritone guitar
 J. D. Foster – bass
 John E. Abbey – bass
 Sim Cain – drums
 Jagoda – drums
 Jim Keltner – drums, percussion
 Joe Sublett – tenor saxophone
 Greg Smith – baritone saxophone, bass saxophone
 Ken Kugler – trombone, bass trombone, tuba
 Darrell Leonard – trombonium, pocket trumpet
 Les Lovitt – flugelhorn
 Dan Kelly – French horn
 Suzette Moriarty – French horn
 Kurt Snyder – French horn
 Miguel Ferrer – backing vocals
 Leslie Kahn – backing vocals
 David Poe – backing vocals

Production

 T-Bone Burnett – producer
 Mike Piersante – engineer, mixing
 Susan Rogers – engineer, mixing
 Cappy Japange – assistant engineer
 Emile Kelman – assistant engineer
 Gavin Lurssen – mastering

References

Nonesuch Records albums
2008 albums
T Bone Burnett albums
Albums produced by T Bone Burnett